Tshesebe is a village in the  North-East District of Botswana. The population in 2001 was 1,519. The population in 2011 was 2,379.

References

Villages in Botswana
North-East District (Botswana)